Rigestan Rural District is a rural district (dehestan) in Zavareh District, Ardestan County, Isfahan Province, Iran. At the 2006 census, its population was 4,157, in 1,102 families.  The rural district has 25 villages.

References 

Rural Districts of Isfahan Province
Ardestan County